The women's canoe sprint K-4 500 metres competition at the 2012 Olympic Games in London took place between 6 and 8 August at Eton Dorney.

Gabriella Szabó, Danuta Kozák, Katalin Kovács and Krisztina Fazekas Zur, representing Hungary, won the gold medal. Germany's team won silver and Belarus took the bronze.

Competition format

The competition comprised three heats, a semi-finals, and a final.  The first boat and second-best in each heat qualified for the final, with the remainder going to the semi-final where the top five boats then qualified for the final.

Schedule
All times are British Summer Time (UTC+01:00)

Results

Heats
The first boat from each heat and the fastest runner-up qualified for the final, with the remainder going to the semi-finals.

Heat 1

Heat 2

Semifinal 
The top five boats qualified for the final.

Final

References 

Canoeing at the 2012 Summer Olympics
Olyp
Women's events at the 2012 Summer Olympics